Kajetan Abgarowicz (pseudonyms: Kajetan Abgar-Soltan, and Soltan Abgar) (7 August 1856 in Czerniów, Kingdom of Galicia and Lodomeria – 27 July 1909 in Truskawiec, Ukraine) was a Polish journalist, novelist and short story writer of Armenian descent.

Life 
Born into a family of landowners, his parents were Franciszek and Salomea née Przysiecka. Abgarowicz attended schools in Stanisławów and Lwów (Lviv), Ukraine. He made his debut in the press as a novelist in 1889. He was co-founder in 1901 of the Lviv newspaper Przedświt, and also ran the literary section. He collaborated with other magazines of Lviv, Krakow and Warsaw, such as Słowo Polskie, Gazeta Lwowska (1894), Czas, Nowa Reforma and Tygodnik Illustrowany.

A popular humorist, Abgarowicz wrote in the mainstream genres of Polish popular fiction, romance, and adventure. Many of his short stories and novels were published, most of which centred on the nobility, especially from the Podolia region, featuring young squires leading an active social life. Abgarowicz was also interested in the life of Rusyns and contributed to the popularity of Hutsuls culture in Poland. While his novels, such as Klub nietoperzy (two volumes, the first of which was published in 1892), Polubowna ugoda (1894), and Z wiejskiego dworu (1895), were characterized as being weak, his collections of short stories and sketches, such as Z carskiej imperii (1892), Rusini (1893) and Widziane i odczute (1904), did not receive the same criticism.

Partial works 
 Klub nietoperzy (1892)
 Józef Jerzy Hordyński-Fed'kowicz (1892)
 Z carskiej imperii (1892)
 Rusini (1893)
 Nie ma metryki (1894)
 Zawiedziona nadzieja (1894)
 Polubowna ugoda (1894)
 Z wiejskiego dworu (1895)
 Dobra nauczka (1896)
 Ilko Szwabiuk (1896)
 Panna Siekierczanka (1897)
 Nea
 Rywale (1904)
 Widziane i odczute (1904)
 Polubowna ugoda (1909)
 Pornografja: głosy polskie w najważniejszej (1909)
 Pierścień Królowej Rumuńskiej (n.d.)

See also 
 Abgarowicz coat of arms
 List of humorists

References

External links 
 Wikisource material in Polish from Kajetan Abgarowicz

1856 births
1909 deaths
People from Ivano-Frankivsk Oblast
People from the Kingdom of Galicia and Lodomeria
Polish people of Armenian descent
19th-century Polish nobility
Polish male novelists
Polish male short story writers
Polish short story writers
Polish humorists
19th-century Polish novelists
20th-century Polish novelists
19th-century short story writers
19th-century Polish male writers
20th-century short story writers
20th-century Polish male writers
19th-century Polish journalists
20th-century Polish journalists